The Bad Creek Hydroelectric Station is a pumped-storage hydroelectric power station located  north of Salem in Oconee County, South Carolina. The  power plant is owned by Duke Energy and its last generator was commissioned in 1991. The power station generates electricity by shifting water between an upper and lower reservoir. The upper Bad Creek Reservoir was created by damming Bad Creek and West Bad Creek while Lake Jocassee serves as the lower reservoir. When energy demand is high, water is released back from Bad Creek Reservoir back down to the pump turbines which then operate as generators. After electricity is produced, the water is returned to Lake Jocassee. The process is repeated as needed, primarily with the facility serving as a peaking power plant.

References

Energy infrastructure completed in 1991
Buildings and structures in Oconee County, South Carolina
Hydroelectric power plants in South Carolina
Pumped-storage hydroelectric power stations in the United States
Duke Energy
1991 establishments in South Carolina